Eubergia is a genus of moths in the family Saturniidae first described by Eugène Louis Bouvier in 1929.

Species
Eubergia argyrea (Weymer, 1908)
Eubergia caisa (Berg, 1883)
Eubergia radians (Dognin, 1911)

References

Hemileucinae
Taxa named by Eugène Louis Bouvier